Emanuel "Manolo" Sánchez (born November 10, 1991) is a Puerto Rican retired professional footballer who played as a midfielder.

Career

Early career
Sanchez spent two years at the University of Louisville between 2010 and 2012, including a red-shirted year in 2010. He transferred to Clemson Tigers in January 2012. While at college, Sanchez appeared for USL PDL club Reading United AC during their 2013 and 2014 seasons.

New York Red Bulls
Sanchez was selected with the 79th overall pick in the 2015 MLS SuperDraft by New York Red Bulls. On February 21, 2015, Sanchez scored his first goal for New York in a 1-0 pre-season victory over Oklahoma City Energy FC. He officially joined the club on March 3, 2015.

Sanchez made his professional debut on March 28, 2015, featuring for New York Red Bulls II during a 0–0 draw against Rochester Rhinos. On May 3, 2015, Sanchez scored his first goal as a professional for New York Red Bulls II in a 3–2 victory over Pittsburgh Riverhounds.  His performance against Pittsburgh earned Sanchez USL Team of the Week honors. On August 29, 2015, Sanchez opened the scoring for NYRBII in a 2–0 victory over Wilmington Hammerheads FC. On September 5, 2015, Sanchez scored the opening goal of the match for New York in a 3–2 victory over Louisville City FC. On September 26, 2015, Sanchez opened the scoring for New York Red Bulls II in a 4-2 extra time victory over Pittsburgh Riverhounds which advanced New York in the 2015 USL Playoffs.

San Antonio FC
Sanchez signed with United Soccer League side San Antonio FC on February 25, 2016. On May 7, Sanchez scored his first goal with the club in a 2–3 defeat to Rio Grande Valley FC Toros.

Harrisburg City Islanders
On March 21, 2017, Sánchez was announced as the new player for USL side Harrisburg City Islanders. He scored his first goal with Harrisburg on April 5, 2017, against his former team New York Red Bulls II.

South Georgia Tormenta FC 
Sanchez was announced as a signing for then-PDL side South Georgia Tormenta on May 8, 2018. After appearances in the U.S. Open Cup and three regular season matches, Sanchez suffered a lower leg injury that kept him out for the remainder of the year.

On January 25, 2019, Sanchez announced his retirement from professional football.

International
Manolo Sánchez began training with the Puerto Rico national football team in December 2015, and played an exhibition match against New York City FC on December 11, 2015. On May 22, 2016, Sánchez made his first official appearance for Puerto Rico, starting in a friendly match against the United States. Following that match, Sánchez was called up for the 2017 Caribbean Cup Qualification where he started both matches of the second round where Puerto Rico faced Grenada and Antigua and Barbuda. On September 3, 2016, Sánchez scored his first and only goal for Puerto Rico with a penalty kick in a friendly match against India in their 4–1 defeat.

Career statistics

References

External links

Tigers profile

1991 births
Living people
Puerto Rican footballers
Puerto Rico international footballers
American soccer players
American people of Puerto Rican descent
Louisville Cardinals men's soccer players
Clemson Tigers men's soccer players
Reading United A.C. players
New York Red Bulls players
New York Red Bulls II players
San Antonio FC players
Association football midfielders
Soccer players from Philadelphia
New York Red Bulls draft picks
USL League Two players
Major League Soccer players
USL Championship players